Music For My Peoples is the second studio album from Huey Dunbar. It was released on August 19, 2003, with the singles "Sin Poderte Hablar" and "A Donde Ire".

Track listing
"Sin Poderte Hablar - 3:21
"Jamás" (Salsa Version) - 4:00
"Bacardi Party" (featuring Magic Juan) - 3:36
"Las Noches" - 3:23
"Llegaste Tú" - 4:09
"Spring Love" (Spanish Version) - 3:37
"A Dónde Iré" - 4:16
"Bésame" - 3:37
"Spring Love" (English Version) - 3:37
"Jamás" (Acoustic Version) - 4:17
"Fuerte" - 4:07
"Chasing Papi" - 3:40

2003 albums
Albums produced by Sergio George
Huey Dunbar albums